The 2017–18 season was Budapest Honvéd FC's 107th competitive season, 13th consecutive season in the OTP Bank Liga and 108th year in existence as a football club.

First team squad

Transfers

Summer

In:

Out:

Winter

In:

Out:

Statistics

Appearances and goals
Last updated on 2 June 2018.

|-
|colspan="14"|Youth players:

|-
|colspan="14"|Players no longer at the club:

|}

Top scorers
Includes all competitive matches. The list is sorted by shirt number when total goals are equal.

Last updated on 2 June 2018

Disciplinary record
Includes all competitive matches. Players with 1 card or more included only.

Last updated on 2 June 2018

Overall
{|class="wikitable"
|-
|Games played || 42 (33 OTP Bank Liga, 2 Champions League and 7 Hungarian Cup)
|-
|Games won || 16 (13 OTP Bank Liga, 0 Champions League and 3 Hungarian Cup)
|-
|Games drawn || 11 (8 OTP Bank Liga, 0 Champions League and 3 Hungarian Cup)
|-
|Games lost || 15 (12 OTP Bank Liga, 2 Champions League and 1 Hungarian Cup)
|-
|Goals scored || 64
|-
|Goals conceded || 65
|-
|Goal difference || -1
|-
|Yellow cards || 88
|-
|Red cards || 5
|-
|rowspan="1"|Worst discipline ||  Botond Baráth (8 , 2 )
|-
|rowspan="1"|Best result || 3–0 (A) v Balmazújváros - OTP Bank Liga - 28-10-2017
|-
|rowspan="2"|Worst result || 1–4 (H) v Vasas OTP Bank Liga - 30-09-2017
|-
| 2–5 (A) v Ferencváros OTP Bank Liga - 24-02-2018
|-
|rowspan="1"|Most appearances ||  Davide Lanzafame (41 appearances)
|-
|rowspan="1"|Top scorer ||  Davide Lanzafame (22 goals)
|-
|Points || 59/126 (46.83%)
|-

Nemzeti Bajnokság I

Matches

League table

Results summary

Results by round

Hungarian Cup

Champions League

The First and Second Qualifying Round draws took place at UEFA headquarters in Nyon, Switzerland on 19 June 2017.

References

External links
 Official Website
 UEFA
 fixtures and results

Budapest Honvéd FC seasons
Hungarian football clubs 2017–18 season